The copyright law of the United States grants monopoly protection for "original works of authorship". With the stated purpose to promote art and culture, copyright law assigns a set of exclusive rights to authors: to make and sell copies of their works, to create derivative works, and to perform or display their works publicly. These exclusive rights are subject to a time limit, and generally expire 70 years after the author's death or 95 years after publication. In the United States, works published before January 1, are in the public domain.

United States copyright law was last generally revised by the Copyright Act of 1976, codified in Title 17 of the United States Code. The United States Constitution explicitly grants Congress the power to create copyright law under Article 1, Section 8, Clause 8, known as the Copyright Clause. Under the Copyright Clause, Congress has the power "To promote the Progress of Science and useful Arts, by securing for limited Times to Authors and Inventors the exclusive Right to their respective Writings and Discoveries."

The United States Copyright Office handles copyright registration, recording of copyright transfers, and other administrative aspects of copyright law.

History

United States copyright law traces its lineage back to the British Statute of Anne, which influenced the first U.S. federal copyright law, the Copyright Act of 1790. The length of copyright established by the Founding Fathers was 14 years, plus the ability to renew it one time, for 14 more. 40 years later, the initial term was changed to 28 years.

It was not until a full 180 years after its establishment that it was significantly extended beyond that, through the Copyright Act of 1976 to "Either 75 years or the life of the author plus 50 years" and the Sonny Bono Copyright Term Extension Act of 1998 (also called the "Mickey Mouse Protection Act", because it prevented the copyright from expiring on the first commercial success of the Disney cartoon character Mickey Mouse), which increased it even more, to 120 years, or the life of the author plus 70 years, whichever ends earlier.

Purpose of copyright

The goal of copyright law, as set forth in the Copyright Clause of the US Constitution, is "to promote the Progress of Science and useful Arts, by securing for limited Times to Authors and Inventors the exclusive Right to their respective Writings and Discoveries." This includes incentivizing the creation of art, literature, architecture, music, and other works of authorship. As with many legal doctrines, the effectiveness of copyright law in achieving its stated purpose is a matter of debate.

Works subject to copyright law 
The United States copyright law protects "original works of authorship" fixed in a tangible medium, including literary, dramatic, musical, artistic, and other intellectual works. This protection is available to both published and unpublished works. Copyright law includes the following types of works:
 Literary
 Musical
 Dramatic
 Pantomimes and choreographic works
 Pictorial, graphic, and sculptural works
 Audio-visual works
 Sound recordings
 Derivative works
 Compilations
 Architectural works

Idea–expression dichotomy
Copyright law protects the "expression" of an idea, but copyright does not protect the "idea" itself. This distinction is called the idea–expression dichotomy. The distinction between "idea" and "expression" is fundamental to copyright law. From the Copyright Act of 1976:

For example, a paper describing a political theory is copyrightable. The paper is the expression of the author's ideas about the political theory. The theory itself is just an idea, and is not copyrightable. Another author is free to describe the same theory in their own words without infringing on the original author's copyright.

Although fundamental, the idea–expression dichotomy is often difficult to put into practice. Reasonable people can disagree about where the unprotectable "idea" ends and the protectable "expression" begins. As Judge Learned Hand put it, "Obviously, no principle can be stated as to when an imitator has gone beyond copying the 'idea,' and has borrowed its 'expression.' Decisions must therefore inevitably be ad hoc."<ref>Peter Pan Fabrics, Inc. v. Martin Weiner Corp ., 274 F.2d 487 (2d Cir. 1960).</ref>

Compilations of facts and the sweat of the brow doctrine
Mere facts are not copyrightable. However, compilations of facts are treated differently, and may be copyrightable material. The Copyright Act, allows copyright protection for "compilations", as long as there is some "creative" or "original" act involved in developing the compilation, such as in the selection (deciding which facts to include or exclude) and arrangement (how facts are displayed and in what order). Copyright protection in compilations is limited to the selection and arrangement of facts, not to the facts themselves.

The Supreme Court decision in Feist Publications, Inc., v. Rural Telephone Service Co. clarified the requirements for copyright in compilations. The Feist case denied copyright protection to a "white pages" phone book (a compilation of telephone numbers, listed alphabetically). In making this ruling, the Supreme Court rejected the "sweat of the brow" doctrine. That is, copyright protection requires creativity, and no amount of hard work ("sweat of the brow") can transform a non-creative list (like an alphabetical listing of phone numbers) into copyrightable subject matter. A mechanical, non-selective collection of facts (e.g., alphabetized phone numbers) cannot be protected by copyright.

Useful articles
Copyright protects artistic expression. Copyright does not protect useful articles, or objects with some useful functionality. The Copyright Act states:

However, many industrial designers create works that are both artistic and functional. Under these circumstances, copyright law only protects the artistic expression of such a work, and only to the extent that the artistic expression can be separated from its utilitarian function.

In 2017, the US Supreme Court granted certiorari in the case Star Athletica, L. L. C. v. Varsity Brands, Inc. to determine when a "pictorial, graphic, or sculptural feature" incorporated into a useful article is eligible for copyright protection, holding that such features are eligible for copyright protection "only if the feature (1) can be perceived as a two- or three-dimensional work of art separate from the useful article and (2) would qualify as a protectable pictorial, graphic, or sculptural work—either on its own or fixed in some other tangible medium of expression—if it were imagined separately from the useful article into which it is incorporated." Star Athletica began as a suit by Varsity Brands against Star Athletica for infringing the copyright of five cheerleader uniform designs. Applying its new test to the cheerleader uniform designs, the court said:

This produces a relatively low threshold for pictorial, graphic, or sculptural features on useful articles to be eligible for copyright protection, which one commentator clearly highlighted: the Star Athletica decision "really has ensured that all but the subtlest graphic designs will be able to gain copyright protection...once we determine that the designs 'hav[e] … graphic … qualities … [and could be] applied … on a painter's canvas,' the test for copyrightability is met."

Works by the federal government

Works created by the federal government are not copyrightable. . This restriction on copyright applies to publications produced by the United States Government, and its agents or employees within the scope of their employment. The specific language is as follows:

Note that government contractors are generally not considered employees, and their works may be subject to copyright. Likewise, the US government can purchase and hold the copyright to works created by third parties.

The government may restrict access to works it has produced through other mechanisms. For instance, confidential or secret materials are not protected by copyright, but are restricted by other applicable laws. However, even in case of non-secret materials there are specific prohibitions against automatic access to work otherwise covered under  for commercial purposes.

Federal and state laws are not protected by copyright

Federal, state, and local statutes and court decisions are in the public domain and are ineligible for copyright, a concept known as the government edicts doctrine. It is not difficult to see the motivations behind this:

Three key Supreme Court cases established this government edicts doctrine: Wheaton v. Peters (1834), Banks v. Manchester (1888), and Callaghan v. Myers (1888). The doctrine was codified into the United States Code at  via the Copyright Act of 1976. The Copyright Office upholds this doctrine within its own regulations:

The Supreme Court has also ruled that annotated versions of statutes or court decisions at the federal, state, and local level, when such annotations are done by members of the government as part of their duties, are ineligible for copyright in Georgia v. Public.Resource.Org, Inc. (2020).

Exclusive rights
There are six basic rights protected by copyright. The owner of a copyright has the exclusive right to do and authorize others to do the following:
 To reproduce the work in copies or phonorecords;
 To prepare derivative works based upon the work;
 To distribute copies or phonorecords of the work to the public by sale or other transfer of ownership, or by rental, lease, or lending;
 To publicly perform the work, in the case of literary, musical, dramatic, and choreographic works, pantomimes, and motion pictures and other audiovisual works;
 To publicly display the work, in the case of literary, musical, dramatic, and choreographic works, pantomimes, and pictorial, graphic, or sculptural works, including the individual images of a motion picture or other audiovisual work.
 To digitally transmit sound recordings by means of digital audio transmission.

A violation of any of the exclusive rights of the copyright holder is a copyright infringement, unless fair use (or a similar affirmative defense) applies.

Authorship, ownership, and work for hire

The initial owner of the copyright to a work is the author, unless that work is a "work made for hire".

Works for hire. If a work is made "for hire" within the meaning of the Copyright Act, then the employer or commissioning party is deemed to be the author and will own the copyright as though it were the true author. These circumstances under which a work may be found to be a work for hire are:
Work prepared by an employee within the scope of their employment. In Community for Creative Non-Violence v. Reid, 490 U.S. 730 (1989), the Supreme Court held that the term "employee" in this context should be interpreted according to common law agency principles. If the person doing the work is an "employee" within the meaning of the common law, and the work was done within the scope of their employment (whether the work is the kind they were employed to prepare; whether the preparation takes place primarily within the employer's time and place specifications; and whether the work was activated, at least in part, by a purpose to serve the employer), then the work is a work for hire and the employer is the initial owner of the copyright.
Specially ordered or commissioned works. Works created by independent contractors (rather than employees) can be deemed works for hire only if two conditions are satisfied. First, the work must fit into one of these categories: a contribution to a collective work, part of a motion picture or other audiovisual work, a translation, a supplementary work, a compilation, an instructional text, a test, answer material for a test, or an atlas. Second, the parties must expressly agree in a written, signed instrument that the work will be considered a work made for hire.

If a work is not a work for hire, then the author will be the initial copyright owner. The author generally is the person who conceives of the copyrightable expression and "fixes" it in a "tangible medium of expression."  Special rules apply when multiple authors are involved:

Joint authorship: The US copyright law recognizes joint authorship in Section 101. The authors of a joint work are co-owners of a single copyright in the work. A joint work is "a work prepared by two or more authors with the intention that their contributions be merged into inseparable or independent parts of a unitary whole."
Collective works: A collective work is a collection of independent, separately copyrightable works of authorship, such as a newspaper, magazine, or encyclopedia. In the absence of an express assignment of copyright, the author of each individual work in the collection retains copyright in that work. The compiler, or author of the collection, owns copyright in the expression he or she contributed, which is primarily the selection and arrangement of the separate contributions, but may include such things as a preface, advertisements, etc., that the collective author created.

Transfers and licenses
Three types of transfers exist for copyrighted works.
Assignment
Exclusive license
Non-exclusive license

The first two, assignment and exclusive licenses, require the transfer to be in writing. Nonexclusive licenses need not be in writing and they may be implied by the circumstances. Transfers of copyright always involve one or more of the exclusive rights of copyright. For instance, a license may provide a right to perform a work, but not to reproduce it or to prepare a derivative work (adaptation right).

The terms of the license are governed by the applicable contract law; however, there is substantial academic debate about to what extent the Copyright Act preempts state contract law principles.

An author, after transferring a copyright, can terminate the transfer under certain circumstances. This right to terminate the transfer is absolute and cannot be waived.

For works published since 1978, copyrights may revert to the original author after 35 years.  states that the author must write a letter requesting a termination of the original copyright grant at least two years before the effective termination date.

Limitations on exclusive rights
Title 17, United States Code, Section 108 places limitations on exclusive copyrights for the purposes of certain limited reproduction by a public library or an archive. Title 17, United States Code, Section 107 also places statutory limits on copyright which are commonly referred to as the fair use exception.

Registration procedure

Copyright is automatically granted to the author of an original work (that otherwise meets the basic copyright requirements, discussed above). Registration is not necessary. However, registration amplifies a copyright holder's rights in a number of ways. Registration is required before a lawsuit can be filed, and registration creates the possibility for enhanced "statutory" damages.

A copyright can be registered online at the US Copyright Office's website. The Copyright Office reviews applications for obvious errors or lack of copyrightable subject matter and then issues a certificate of registration. The Copyright Office does not compare the author's new work against a collection of existing works or otherwise check for infringement.

Deposit requirement
The United States Copyright Office requires a deposit copy of the work for which copyright registration is sought. Deposits can be made through the Copyright Office's eCO System. This deposit requirement serves two purposes. First, if a copyright infringement lawsuit arises, the owner may prove that the material that is infringed is exactly the same material for which the owner has secured a registration. Second, this requirement helps the Library of Congress build its collection of works.

Failure to comply with the deposit requirement, as modified by Copyright Office regulations, is punishable by fine, but does not result in forfeiture of copyright.

Copyright notices

The use of copyright notices is optional. The Berne Convention, amending US copyright law in 1989, makes copyright automatic. However, the lack of notice of copyright using these marks may have consequences in terms of reduced damages in an infringement lawsuit—using notices of this form may reduce the likelihood of a defense of "innocent infringement" being successful.

Duration of copyright

Copyright protection generally lasts for 70 years after the death of the author. If the work was a "work for hire", then copyright persists for 120 years after creation or 95 years after publication, whichever is shorter. For works created before 1978, the copyright duration rules are complicated. However, works published before January 1,  (other than sound recordings), have made their way into the public domain.

Works created before 1978
For works published or registered before 1978, the maximum copyright duration is 95 years from the date of publication, if copyright was renewed during the 28th year following publication. Copyright renewal has been automatic since the Copyright Renewal Act of 1992.

For works created before 1978, but not published or registered before 1978, the standard §302 copyright duration of 70 years from the author's death also applies. Prior to 1978, works had to be published or registered to receive copyright protection. Upon the effective date of the 1976 Copyright Act (which was January 1, 1978) this requirement was removed and these unpublished, unregistered works received protection. However, Congress intended to provide an incentive for these authors to publish their unpublished works. To provide that incentive, these works, if published before 2003, would not have their protection expire before 2048.

All copyrightable works published in the United States before  are in the public domain; works created but not published or copyrighted before January 1, 1978, may be protected until 2047. For works that received their copyright before 1978, a renewal had to be filed in the work's 28th year with the Copyright Office for its term of protection to be extended. The need for renewal was eliminated by the Copyright Renewal Act of 1992, but works that had already entered the public domain by non-renewal did not regain copyright protection. Therefore, works published before 1964 that were not renewed are in the public domain.

Before 1972, sound recordings were not subject to federal copyright, but copying was nonetheless regulated under various state torts and statutes, some of which had no duration limit. The Sound Recording Amendment of 1971 extended federal copyright to recordings fixed on or after February 15, 1972, and declared that recordings fixed before that date would remain subject to state or common law copyright. Subsequent amendments had extended this latter provision until 2067. As a result, older sound recordings were not subject to the expiration rules that applied to contemporary visual works. Although these could have entered the public domain as a result of government authorship or formal grant by the owner, the practical effect has been to render public domain audio virtually nonexistent.

This situation changed with the 2018 enactment of the Music Modernization Act, which extended federal copyright protection to all sound recordings, regardless of their date of creation, and preempted state copyright laws on those works. Under the Act, the first sound recordings to enter the public domain were those fixed before 1923, which entered the public domain on January 1, 2022. Recordings fixed between 1923 and February 14, 1972, will be phased into the public domain in the following decades. Specifically, works fixed 1923–1946 are public after 100 years and works fixed 1947–1956 after 110 years of fixation. Works fixed 1 January 1957 – 14 February 1972 will all become public on 15 February 2067.

In May 2016, Judge Percy Anderson ruled in a lawsuit between ABS Entertainment and CBS Radio that "remastered" versions of pre-1972 recordings can receive a federal copyright as a distinct work due to the amount of creative effort expressed in the process. The Ninth Circuit appeals court reversed the decision in favor of ABS Entertainment.

Copyright limitations, exceptions, and defenses
United States copyright law includes numerous defenses, exceptions, and limitations. Some of the most important include:

 Copyright applies only to certain copyrightable subject matter, codified within . Works that are not "original works of authorship fixed in any tangible medium of expression" are not subject to copyright.  codifies that copyright protection does not extend to ideas, procedures, processes, systems, etc. Facts may not be copyrighted. "Useful articles" may not be copyrighted. Useful articles includes typeface designs (Eltra Corp. v. Ringer), fashion designs, blank forms, titles, names, short phrases, slogans, lists of ingredients and contents, domain names and band names.

 The first-sale doctrine, limits the rights of copyright holders to control the further distribution and display of copies of their works after the first sale by the copyright owner. The owner of a particular copy is entitled to "sell or otherwise dispose of the possession of that copy" and to "display the copy publicly ... to viewers present at the place where the copy is located."
 The "good faith" defense (Section 504(c)(2)) reduces the statutory damages where the infringer was an educational institution, library, archive, or public broadcaster and reasonably believed that the infringing use was "fair use."
 The Copyright Act includes specific exemptions for types of works and particular entities, such as libraries, public broadcasters, braille software backup copies, "cover license" permitting sound recording covers, and jukebox compulsory licenses.
 Provisions for the Blind and Disabled: The Copyright Act, in 17 USC 121 and 17 USC 110(8), includes specific statutory exceptions for reproduction of material for the blind or other persons with disabilities.  Section 121 (the "Chafee Amendment") permits the reproduction of copyright works in Braille, audio, electronic, Web-Braille, or other necessary formats. For instance, the National Library Service for the Blind and Physically Handicapped (NLS) administers a program under Section 121, and the HathiTrust Digital Library also relies on Section 121 in providing access to disabled users.
 Online Service Provider "Safe Harbor": Section 512 ("OCILLA", passed as part of the DMCA in 1998) provides a contingent "safe harbor" for online service providers from secondary liability for their users' copy infringements.
 US copyright law does not allow works created by animals to be copyrighted.  The Compendium lists several examples of such ineligible works, including "a photograph taken by a monkey" and "a mural painted by an elephant".

Fair use

Fair use is the use of limited amounts of copyrighted material in such a way as to not be an infringement. The section lists four factors that must be assessed to determine whether a particular use is fair. There are no bright-line rules regarding fair use and each determination is made on an individualized case-by-case basis.Purpose and character of the use, including whether the use is of a commercial nature or is for nonprofit educational purposes:  Nonprofit educational and noncommercial uses are more likely to be fair use. This does not mean that all nonprofit education and noncommercial uses are fair use or that all commercial uses are not fair. Instead, courts will balance the purpose and character of the use against the other factors below. Additionally, "transformative" uses are more likely to be considered fair. Transformative uses are those that add something new, with a further purpose or different character, and do not substitute for the original use of the work.Nature of the copyrighted work:  Using a more creative or imaginative work (such as a novel, movie, or song) is less likely to support fair use than using a factual work (such as a technical article or news item). In addition, use of an unpublished work is less likely to be considered fair.Amount and substantiality of the portion used in relation to the copyrighted work as a whole:  Courts look at both the quantity and quality of the copyrighted material that was used. Using a large portion of the copyrighted work is less likely to be fair use. However, courts have occasionally found use of an entire work to be fair use, and in other contexts, using even a small amount of a copyrighted work was determined not to be fair use because the selection was an important part—or the "heart"—of the work.Effect of the use upon the potential market for or value of the copyrighted work:  Here, courts review whether, and to what extent, the unlicensed use harms the existing or future market for the copyright owner's original work. In assessing this factor, courts consider whether the use is hurting the current market for the original work (for example, by displacing sales of the original) and/or whether the use could cause substantial harm if it were to become widespread.

In addition to these four factors, the statute also allows courts to consider any other factors that may be relevant to the fair use analysis. Courts evaluate fair use claims on a case-by-case basis, and the outcome of any given case depends on the specific facts of that case. There is no formula to ensure that a predetermined percentage or amount of a work—or specific number of words, lines, pages, copies—may be used without permission.

The justification of the fair use doctrine turns primarily on whether, and to what extent, the challenged use is transformative. "The use must be productive and must employ the quoted matter in a different manner or for a different purpose from the original. A quotation of copyrighted material that merely repackages or republishes the original is unlikely to pass the test.... If, on the other hand, the secondary use adds value to the original—if the quoted matter is used as raw material, transformed in the creation of new information, new aesthetics, new insights and understandings—this is the very type of activity that the fair use doctrine intends to protect for the enrichment of society."

The Copyright Office provides a searchable list of fair use case law.

Infringement
Copyright infringement occurs when someone violates one of the exclusive rights listed in 17 USC 106. Commonly, this involves someone creating or distributing a "copy" of a protected work that is "substantially similar" to the original version.

Infringements requires copying. If two people happen to write exactly the same story, without knowledge of the other, there is no infringement.

Copyright infringement litigation

A copyright owner may bring a copyright infringement lawsuit in federal court. Federal courts have exclusive subject-matter jurisdiction over copyright infringement cases. That is, an infringement case may not be brought in state courts. (With an exception for works not protected under Federal law, but are protected under state law, e.g. state laws prohibiting copying of sound recordings made before February 15, 1972.) Note that the Copyright Office handles copyright registrations, but it does not adjudicate copyright infringement disputes.

 Ownership of valid copyright 
To bring a copyright infringement lawsuit, a copyright holder must establish ownership of a valid copyright and the copying of constituent elements of the work that are original. The copyright owner must also establish both (a) actual copying and (b) improper appropriation of the work.  The copyright owner, as plaintiff, bears the burden of establishing these three elements of the prima facie case for infringement.

A plaintiff establishes ownership by authorship (by the plaintiff itself or by someone who assigned rights to the plaintiff) of (1) an original work of authorship that is (2) fixed in a tangible medium (e.g. a book, musical recording, etc.).

Registration is not required to establish copyright protection, but registration is necessary before bringing a lawsuit. Registration is also useful because it creates a presumption of a valid copyright, it allows the plaintiff to collect enhanced "statutory damages", and to be eligible for an award of attorney fees.

A plaintiff establishes "actual copying" with direct or indirect evidence. Direct evidence is satisfied either by a defendant's admission to copying or the testimony of witnesses who observed the defendant in the act. More commonly, a plaintiff relies on circumstantial or indirect evidence. A court will infer copying by a showing of a "striking similarity" between the copyrighted work and the alleged copy, along with a showing of both access and use of that access. A plaintiff may establish "access" by proof of distribution over a large geographical area, or by eyewitness testimony that the defendant owned a copy of the protected work. Access alone is not sufficient to establish infringement. The plaintiff must show a similarity between the two works, and the degree of similarity will affect the probability that illicit copying in fact occurred in the court's eyes. Even then, the plaintiff must show that the copying amounted to improper appropriation. Indeed, the United States Supreme Court has held that not all copying constitutes infringement and a showing of misappropriation is necessary.

 Misappropriation 
A copyrighted work may contain elements which are not copyrightable, such as facts, ideas, themes, or content in the public domain. A plaintiff alleging misappropriation must first demonstrate that what the defendant appropriated from the copyrighted work was protectable. Second, a plaintiff must show that the intended audience will recognize substantial similarities between the two works. The intended audience may be the general public, or a specialized field. The degree of similarity necessary for a court to find misappropriation is not easily defined. Indeed, "the test for infringement of a copyright is of necessity vague."

Two methods are used to determine if unlawful appropriation has occurred: the "subtractive method" and the "totality method".

The subtractive method, also known as the "abstraction/subtraction approach", seeks to analyze which parts of a copyrighted work are protectible and which are not. The unprotected elements are subtracted and the fact finder then determines whether substantial similarities exist in the protectible expression which remains. For instance, if the copyright holder for West Side Story alleged infringement, the elements of that musical borrowed from Romeo and Juliet would be subtracted before comparing it to the allegedly infringing work because Romeo and Juliet exists in the public domain.

The totality method, also known as the "total concept and feel" approach, takes the work as a whole with all elements included when determining if a substantial similarity exists.
This was first formulated in Roth Greeting Cards v. United Card Co. (1970). The individual elements of the alleged infringing work may by themselves be substantially different from their corresponding part in the copyrighted work, but nevertheless taken together be a clear misappropriation of copyrightable material.

Modern courts may sometimes use both methods in their analysis of misappropriation. In other instances, one method may find misappropriation while the other would not, making misappropriation a contentious topic in infringement litigation.

Civil remedies
A successful copyright infringement plaintiff may seek both "injunctive relief" and monetary damages. As of 2019, the United States Supreme Court has held that a copyright holder must register his copyright with the U.S. copyright office before he may seek any judicial remedies for infringement.

Injunctions: Copyright Act § 502 authorizes courts to grant both preliminary and permanent injunctions against copyright infringement. There are also provisions for impounding allegedly infringing copies and other materials used to infringe, and for their destruction.

Damages and/or Profits: Copyright Act § 504 gives the copyright owner a choice of recovering: (1) their actual damages and any additional profits of the defendant; or (2) statutory damages.

However, Title 17 United States Code §411(a) states that a civil action to enforce a copyright claim in a US work cannot be made until the work has been registered with the U.S. Copyright Office, with a narrow exception if the claim was filed and rejected by the Copyright Office. In 2019, the U.S. Supreme Court decided that §411(a) requires that a lawsuit cannot be initiated until the Copyright Office has processed, not merely received, the application.

Equitable relief

Both temporary and permanent injunctions are available to prevent or restrain infringement of a copyright. An "injunction" is a court order directing the defendant to stop doing something (e.g., stop selling infringing copies). One form of equitable relief that is available in copyright cases is a seizure order. At any time during the lawsuit, the court may order the impoundment of any and all copies of the infringing products. The seizure order may include materials used to produce such copies, such as master tapes, film negatives, printing plates, etc. Items that are impounded during the course of the lawsuit can, if the plaintiff wins, be ordered destroyed as part of the final decree.

Monetary damages

A copyright holder can also seek monetary damages. Injunctions and damages are not mutually exclusive. One can have injunctions and no damages, or damages and no injunctions, or both injunctions and damages. There are two types of damages: actual damages and profits, or statutory damages.

The copyright owner may recover the profits he or she would have earned absent the infringement (actual damages) and any profits the infringer might have made as a result of the infringement but that are not already considered in calculating actual damages. To recover actual damages, the plaintiff must prove to the court that, in the absence of the infringement, the plaintiff would have been able to make additional sales, or perhaps been able to charge higher prices, and that this would have resulted in profits given the owner's cost structure.  In some cases, the profits earned by the infringer exploiting the copyrighted material may exceed those earned by or potentially available to the owner. In these circumstances, the copyright owner can recover the infringer's profits if he or she can demonstrate a nexus between the profits and the infringing use.

Statutory damages are available as an alternative to actual damages and profits. If the copyright was registered either (a) within three months of publication or (b) before the infringement, then the plaintiff is eligible to seek statutory damages. Statutory damages can be awarded by the court within the range of $750 to $30,000, but this can be lowered if the infringement is deemed inadvertent, or increased significantly if the infringement is willful.

Statutory damages are sometimes preferable for the plaintiff if actual damages and profits are too small, too difficult to prove, or both. There are, however, situations where statutory damages are not available.  provides:
 Statutory damages are not available if the work is unpublished and the infringement began before the effective date of its registration.
 Statutory damages are not available if the work is published but the infringement commenced after the first publication and before the effective date of its registration, unless registration is made within three months after the first publication.
Statutory damages are calculated per work infringed. According to clause (1) of Title 17, U.S.C. Section 504(c), statutory damages range from $750 per work to $30,000 per work, with two principal exceptions:
 In case of "innocent infringement", the amount may be reduced to a sum "not less than $200" for an effective range of $200 to $30,000 per work. "Innocent" is a technical term. In particular, if the work carries a copyright notice, the infringer cannot claim innocence.
 In case of "willful infringement" (again, "willful" is a technical term), statutory damages can be no more than $150,000 for an effective range of $750 to $150,000 per work.

Damages in copyright cases can be very high. In Lowry's Reports, Inc. v. Legg Mason Inc., a 2003 lawsuit between a publisher of stock analysis newsletters against a company that buys one copy of the newsletters and makes multiple copies for use in-house, the jury awarded damages – actual damages for some newsletters and statutory damages for other newsletters – totaling $20 million.

Attorney's fees

Cost and attorney fees: Copyright Act § 505 permits courts, in their discretion, to award costs against either party and to award reasonable attorney fees to the prevailing party. The court may (but is not required to) award to the "prevailing party" reasonable attorney's fees. This applies to both a winning plaintiff (copyright owner) and a winning defendant (accused infringer). However, attorney's fees award is not available against the government. Like statutory damages, attorney's fees are not available if the work infringed is not registered at the time of infringement.

Criminal penalties

In addition to the civil remedies, the Copyright Act provides for criminal prosecution in some cases of willful copyright infringement. There are also criminal sanctions for fraudulent copyright notice, fraudulent removal of copyright notice, and false representations in applications for copyright registration. The Digital Millennium Copyright Act imposes criminal sanctions for certain acts of circumvention and interference with copyright management information. There are not criminal sanctions for violating the rights of attribution and integrity held by the author of a work of visual art.

Criminal penalties for copyright infringement include:
 A fine of not more than $500,000 or imprisonment for not more than five years, or both, for the first offense.
 A fine of not more than $1 million or imprisonment for not more than 10 years, or both, for repeated offenses.
Nonprofit libraries, archives, education institutions and public broadcasting entities are exempt from criminal prosecution.

Felony penalties for first offenses begin at seven copies for audiovisual works, and one hundred copies for sound recordings.

Government infringement
The US government, its agencies and officials, and corporations owned or controlled by it, are subject to suit for copyright infringement. All infringement claims against the U.S. that did not arise in a foreign country must be filed with the United States Court of Federal Claims within three years of the infringing action. Claims filed in the wrong court are dismissed for lack of subject-matter jurisdiction. The government and its agencies are also authorized to settle the infringement claims out of court.

The states have sovereign immunity provided by the Eleventh Amendment to the United States Constitution, which bars most forms of lawsuits against states in federal courts, but can be abrogated in certain circumstances by Congress. The Copyright Remedy and Clarification Act of 1990 (CRCA) states in part that states are liable to copyright infringement "in the same manner and to the same extent as any nongovernmental entity" and also that states and state entities and officials "shall not be immune, under the Eleventh Amendment to the Constitution of the United States or under any other doctrine of sovereign immunity, from suit in Federal Court by any person" alleging copyright infringement. The CRCA has been declared unconstitutional by several federal courts., and this was upheld by the US Supreme Court on March 23, 2020.

Public domain

Works in the public domain are free for anyone to copy and use. Strictly speaking, the term "public domain" means that the work is not covered by any intellectual property rights at all (copyright, trademark, patent, or otherwise). However, this article discusses public domain with respect to copyright only.

A work may enter the public domain in a number of different ways. For example, (a) the copyright protecting the work may have expired, or (b) the owner may have explicitly donated the work to the public, or (c) the work is not the type of work that copyright can protect.

 Orphan works 

The "orphan works" problem arose in the United States with the enactment of the Copyright Act of 1976, which eliminated the need to register copyrighted works, instead declaring that all "original works of authorship fixed in any tangible medium of expression" fall into copyright status. The elimination of registration also eliminated a central recording location to track and identify copyright-holders. Consequently, potential users of copyrighted works, e.g., filmmakers or biographers, must assume that many works they might use are copyrighted. Where the planned use would not be otherwise permitted by law (for example, by fair use), they must themselves individually investigate the copyright status of each work they plan to use. With no central database of copyright-holders, identifying and contacting copyright-holders can sometimes be difficult; those works that fall into this category may be considered "orphaned".

 Copyright reform 

Critics of copyright assert that copyright protections last too long before copyrighted works are allowed to enter into the public domain. For works published after 1977, the copyright lasts for the life of the author plus 70 years. However, if the work is a work for hire (that is, the work is done in the course of employment or has been commissioned) or is published anonymously, the copyright lasts between 95 and 120 years, depending on the date the work is published. In 2022, legislation introduced by Senator Josh Hawley, entitled the Copyright Clause Restoration Act of 2022, seeks to reduce the protection from 70 years after the creator's death (post 1978) and 95 years (pre 1978) to 28 years, with the option to renew at the end of that term for a limit of 56 years total. These same terms were in place from 1909 up until 1976.

See also

References

Further reading
 Copyright Law of the United States (US Copyright Office, 2011). 
 Copyright Law, Second Edition, Prof. Robert Gorman (Federal Judicial Center, 2006).
 Intellectual Property: Law & the Information Society. Cases & Materials  (First Edition, 2014)  James Boyle and Jennifer Jenkin. 
 Toward a Fair Use Standard.'' Pierre N. Leval (103 Harvard Law Review 1105 (1990)).

External links

 United States Copyright Office
 Copyright Office—Searchable Fair Use Index
 United States Copyright Office list of circulars
 Copyright Law of the United States
  Cornell University: Copyright Term and the Public Domain in the United States
 Digital copyright slider to determine copyright status of a work
 
 Copyright Timeline: A History of Copyright in the U.S.
 Text of every version of U.S. Copyright Act for 1909 to the present
 Jeanne C. Fromer & Christopher Jon Sprigman, Copyright Law: Cases and Materials (v. 4.0)

 
United States